Padogobius bonelli, the Padanian goby, is a species of true goby from the family Gobiidae native to rivers of Croatia, Italy, Slovenia, and Switzerland, where it is usually found in areas with gravel substrates or dense vegetation along the edges.  Males of this species can reach a length of  TL while females only reach  TL. This species' specific name honours the Italian naturalist Franco Andrea Bonelli (1784-1830), who had originally described this species as Gobius fluviatilis without realizing that this name was already being used for a different goby species, the monkey goby, which had been described by Pallas in 1814.

References

Padogobius
Fish described in 1846
Taxa named by Charles Lucien Bonaparte
Taxonomy articles created by Polbot